"Russian Lullaby" is a song by Swedish musician Bo Martin Erik Erikson, known under the pseudonym of E-Type, released as the last single from his debut album, Made in Sweden (1994). Written by Jonas Berggren from Ace of Base, it also features backing vocals from him, with Jeanette Söderholm and Max Martin. It peaked at number 45 in Sweden and number 35 in France. A music video was also produced to promote the single.

Irving Berlin wrote a song by the same name.

Music video
A music video was produced to promote the single. It was later published on E-Type's official YouTube channel in March 2016. The video has amassed more than 5 million views as of September 2021.

Track listing
 CD single, Sweden (1995)
"Russian Lullaby" (Radio Version) – 3:12
"Believe in Me" – 3:33

 CD maxi, Europe (1995)
"Russian Lullaby" (Radio Edit) – 3:17 
"Russian Lullaby" (Dogshit Le Club) – 6:02 
"Russian Lullaby" (Vodka Russian Mix) – 4:59 
"Russian Lullaby" (JJ's USS Hard Mix) – 8:48

Charts

References

 

1995 singles
1995 songs
E-Type (musician) songs
Songs written by Jonas Berggren
Stockholm Records singles
English-language Swedish songs